Brittany Anne Snow (born March 9, 1986) is an American actress. She rose to prominence after appearing on the CBS soap opera Guiding Light (1998–2001), for which she won a Young Artist Award for Best Young Actress and was nominated for two other Young Artist Awards and a Soap Opera Digest Award. She then starred on the NBC drama series American Dreams (2002–2005), for which she was nominated for a Young Artist Award and three Teen Choice Awards.

Snow has appeared in various films, including The Pacifier (2005), John Tucker Must Die (2006), Hairspray (2007), Prom Night (2008), Would You Rather (2012), the Pitch Perfect film series (2012, 2015, 2017), Bushwick (2017), Hangman (2017), Someone Great (2019), and X (2022). She also appeared on the NBC legal comedy-drama series Harry's Law (2011) and on the Fox drama series Almost Family (2019–2020). Snow made her directorial debut with Parachute, which premiered at the SXSW festival in March 2023.

Snow is the co-founder of the Love Is Louder movement, a project by the not-for-profit Jed Foundation, dedicated to stop bullying in schools.

Life and career 
Brittany Anne Snow was born on March 9, 1986, and raised in Tampa, Florida. She is the daughter of Cinda and John Snow. She has a brother and a sister. She attended Gaither High School in Tampa.

Snow began modeling at the age of three in a print ad for Burdines department stores. She was on CBS' soap opera Guiding Light for three years as troubled teen Susan "Daisy" Lemay. She played Meg Pryor on NBC's drama series American Dreams and neo-Nazi high school student Ariel Alderman on the third season of Nip/Tuck. She sang backup vocals on the American Dreams soundtrack for the song "My Boyfriend's Back." She appeared in the family comedy film The Pacifier (2005) alongside Lauren Graham and Vin Diesel. Snow appeared in the teen romantic comedy film John Tucker Must Die (2006) opposite Jesse Metcalfe. The film was a commercial success and made $68 million worldwide. In 2006, she voiced Naminé in the video game Kingdom Hearts II and Shizuku Tsukishima in the Studio Ghibli film Whisper of the Heart. She also portrayed a young woman afflicted with bipolar disorder in the season seven finale of Law & Order: Special Victims Unit. Snow appeared in the music video for "The Phrase That Pays" by The Academy Is..., which was released in July 2006.

Snow appeared in Hairspray (2007), a film adaptation of the Broadway musical, playing Amber Von Tussle, the daughter of Michelle Pfeiffer's character. She had already worked with Hairspray director Adam Shankman on the Disney film The Pacifier. With her role in Hairspray, her musical side is shown in several numbers including a solo entitled "The New Girl In Town", a song previously cut from the Broadway musical version. She played the lead role of Donna Keppel in the slasher film Prom Night (2008), which was released on April 11, 2008, and grossed $57.2 million at the box office. Snow appeared as young Lily Bass in Gossip Girl, in the episode "Valley Girls". On January 17, 2011, Snow began appearing as a series regular in the first season of the legal drama Harry's Law, and returned as a recurring character in season two. She starred alongside Evan Ross in the thriller film 96 Minutes (2011).

In 2012, Snow starred in the musical comedy film Pitch Perfect, as a cappella singer Chloe. She reprised her role in Pitch Perfect 2 (2015), which received generally positive reviews from critics and grossed over $287 million worldwide. It surpassed the total gross of the original film ($115.4 million) in five days, and also became the highest-grossing music comedy film of all-time, overtaking School of Rock ($131.3 million). She again reprised her role a final time in Pitch Perfect 3 (2017), which received mixed reviews from critics and grossed $185 million worldwide. In November of 2012, she was cast in the sitcom Ben and Kate as Lila, a love interest for Tommy. Snow portrayed Michelle in the comedy film The Late Bloomer (2016) and had the lead role of Lucy in the action thriller film Bushwick (2017). 

Snow portrayed Blair Helms in Netflix's romantic comedy film Someone Great (2019). Snow announced her engagement to realtor and pro surfer Tyler Stanaland on February 19, 2019. They married in Malibu on March 14, 2020. Snow announced their separation through social media on September 14, 2022. She starred in filmmaker Ti West’s horror film X (2022) as Bobby-Lynne Parker.

Snow made her directorial debut with Parachute, which premiered at the SXSW festival in March 2023.

Philanthropy 
Snow has supported numerous charities, including Clothes Off Our Back, Declare Yourself, Do Something, Feeding America, Habitat For Humanity, Point Foundation, Red Cross, Soles4Souls, The Heart Truth, The Trevor Project, Stomp Out Bullying and The Art of Elysium. Snow walked the runway at The Heart Truth's Red Dress Collection fashion show during New York Fashion Week on February 13, 2009. The Heart Truth is a campaign meant to raise awareness of the risk of heart disease in women. Snow has supported Soles4Souls's Barefoot Week. "Whether it's a child struggling to go to school in Kenya, or an American who needs a pair of work boots, Soles4Souls is there to answer the simple requests of millions of people. We hope you will participate in Barefoot Week and help change the world, one pair at a time," she said. In 2012, she appeared in the NOH8 Campaign.

She is the co-creator of the Love is Louder movement, a project by the not-for-profit Jed Foundation. Thousands of individuals, campuses, and communities have used Love is Louder's programs, events and clubs to address issues such as bullying, body image, discrimination, and depression. Snow was recognized by the Substance Abuse and Mental Health Services Administration in 2015 with a Special Recognition Voice Award for her efforts to bring attention to mental health issues.

Public image 

Snow has been featured on the cover of numerous magazines, including CosmoGirl, Teen, Maxim, Entertainment Weekly, People, YM Prom, Miami Living and Vegas, and pictorials for Zooey Magazine, Vanity Fair, Cosmopolitan and InStyle. She has appeared in television commercials for McDonald's, Busch Gardens and Lipton. Snow walked the runway at the Just Dance fashion show on September 12, 2013.

Filmography

Film

Television

Director

Video games

Music videos

Soundtrack appearances 
 Hairspray (2007)
 Pitch Perfect (2012)
 Pitch Perfect 2  (2015)
 Pitch Perfect 3  (2017)

Awards and nominations

References

External links 

 

1986 births
Living people
20th-century American actresses
21st-century American actresses
Actresses from Tampa, Florida
American child actresses
American film actresses
American soap opera actresses
American television actresses
American video game actresses
American voice actresses
Anti-bullying activists
Gaither High School alumni
Mental health activists
Musicians from Tampa, Florida